Jarvis Landing may refer to:

Jarvis Landing, California, a suburb of Newark
Jarvis Landing (Oregon), a former ferry landing on Coos Bay